The Senate Banking Subcommittee on Housing, Transportation, and Community Development is one of five subcommittees within the Senate Committee on Banking, Housing, and Urban Affairs.

Jurisdiction
The Subcommittee on Housing, Transportation, and Community Development is the primary oversight committee for the U.S. Department of Housing and Urban Development (HUD). The subcommittee oversees urban mass transit systems and general urban affairs and development issues, HUD community development programs; the Federal Housing Administration; the Rural Housing Service; and Fannie Mae and Freddie Mac, federal corporations that help Americans with the costs of homeownership. The subcommittee also oversees all issues related to public and private housing, senior housing, nursing home construction, and Indian housing issues.

Members, 118th Congress

Historical subcommittee rosters

117th Congress

See also 
 U.S. House Financial Services Subcommittee on Housing and Community Opportunity

References

External links
U.S. Senate Committee on Banking, Housing, and Urban Affairs
Senate Banking Committee membership page

 

Banking Senate Housing, Transportation, and Community Development